"Freedom Fighters" is a song from The Music's second album, Welcome to the North. It was also the first single from that album, released in Japan in late August 2004 as an EP and in the UK and elsewhere in Europe as a single in early September 2004. It peaked at the #15 position in the British charts.

Track listing

In Japan
EP released 25 August 2004 by Toshiba-EMI
CD VJCP-61092
"Freedom Fighters"
"Getaway" (slow version)
"So Low"
"Freedom Fighters" (John Digweed and Nick Muir remix)

In the UK
Single released 6 September 2004 by Virgin Records
CD1 VSCDT1883
"Freedom Fighters"
"Come What May"
CD2 VSCDX1883
"Freedom Fighters"
"So Low"
"The People" (Nick McCabe remix)
"Freedom Fighters" (Video)
7" VS1883
"Freedom Fighters"
"Getaway" (slow version)

External links
Article detailing the release of the single

The Music (band) songs
2004 singles
Song recordings produced by Brendan O'Brien (record producer)
2004 songs
Virgin Records singles